Chaffee County is a county located in the U.S. state of Colorado. As of the 2020 census, the population was 19,476. The county seat is Salida.

History
Chaffee County has a confusing origin. Between February 8 and February 10, 1879, Carbonate County was created by the Colorado legislature out of northern Lake County. On February 10 the two counties were renamed, with the southern part of Lake County becoming Chaffee County, and Carbonate County becoming Lake County. Chaffee County is known as the “Heart of the Rockies”. It was named for Jerome B. Chaffee, Colorado's first United States Senator.

Geography

Adjacent counties
Lake County - north
Park County - northeast
Fremont County - southeast
Saguache County - south
Gunnison County - west
Pitkin County - northwest

Major Highways
  U.S. Highway 24
  U.S. Highway 50
  U.S. Highway 285
  State Highway 291
  State Highway 306

National protected areas
Browns Canyon National Monument
Buffalo Peaks Wilderness
Collegiate Peaks Wilderness
San Isabel National Forest

Recreation area
Arkansas Headwaters Recreation Area

Trails
American Discovery Trail
Colorado Trail
Continental Divide National Scenic Trail

Bicycle routes
Great Parks Bicycle Route
Western Express Bicycle Route

Demographics

At the 2000 census there were 16,242 people, 6,584 households, and 4,365 families living in the county. The racial makeup of the county was 90.94% White, 1.58% Black or African American, 1.09% Native American, 0.44% Asian, 0.05% Pacific Islander, 4.21% from other races, and 1.69% from two or more races. 8.58% of the population were Hispanic or Latino of any race.
Of the 6,584 households 25.20% had children under the age of 18 living with them, 56.70% were married couples living together, 6.80% had a female householder with no husband present, and 33.70% were non-families. 28.40% of households were one person and 11.20% were one person aged 65 or older. The average household size was 2.26 and the average family size was 2.77.

The age distribution was 19.70% under the age of 18, 7.70% from 18 to 24, 28.00% from 25 to 44, 27.50% from 45 to 64, and 17.00% 65 or older. The median age was 42 years. For every 100 females, there were 113.60 males. For every 100 females age 18 and over, there were 116.20 males.

The median household income was $34,368 and the median family income was $42,043. Males had a median income of $30,770 versus $22,219 for females. The per capita income for the county was $19,430. About 7.40% of families and 11.70% of the population were below the poverty line, including 17.30% of those under age 18 and 10.20% of those age 65 or over.

Chaffee County is also home to a source of water that Arrowhead water uses for some water bottles. The source is Ruby Mountain Springs.

Politics

Chaffee County is a bellwether county, having supported the winner of 8 out of the last 11 presidential elections. The most recent election where Chaffee County supported the presidential loser was in 2008, when John McCain won the county despite Barack Obama winning decisively nationally and statewide.

Communities

City
Salida

Towns
Buena Vista
Poncha Springs

Census-designated places
Garfield
Johnson Village
Maysville
 Nathrop
Smeltertown

Unincorporated communities

Alpine
Americus
Belleview
Browns Canon
Centerville
Cleora
Futurity
Granite
Hamilton
Newett
Princeton
Riverside
Rockdale
St. Elmo
Stonewall
Turret

Ghost towns

St. Elmo
Vicksburg
Winfield

See also

Outline of Colorado
Index of Colorado-related articles
National Register of Historic Places listings in Chaffee County, Colorado

References

External links

Cultural, Historical and Archeological Resources
Chaffee County Clerk of Court
Chaffee County Government website
Colorado County Evolution by Don Stanwyck
Colorado Historical Society
Geologic Map of the Harvard Lakes 7.5ʹ Quadrangle, Park and Chaffee Counties, Colorado United States Geological Survey

 

 
1879 establishments in Colorado
Colorado counties
Populated places established in 1879